JK Kim Dong Uk (born December 11, 1975) is a South Korean singer, musical actor and the MC of music program "Dran".

Education
Jazz vocal, Humber College, Canada.

Discography
GOLD (2017)
Universe (2017)
Dirty Dancing(2014)
Beautifool (2013)
Higher(2012)
Zebra(2011)
I love you today(2010)
Come to me(2008)
Strange Heaven (2007)
Zebra(2006)
Acousti.K (2005)
Memories In Heaven(2004)
Multiplepersonalize (2003)
LifeSentence (2002)

References

External links

 official site

1975 births
Living people
South Korean jazz singers
South Korean male musical theatre actors
South Korean radio presenters
21st-century South Korean  male singers
Male jazz musicians